The 2006–07 A1 Grand Prix of Nations, Shanghai, China was an A1 Grand Prix race,  held on April 15, 2007 at the Shanghai International Circuit, China. This was the tenth race in the 2006-07 A1 Grand Prix season and the second meeting held at the circuit and also the second race in China this season.

Report

Practice

Qualifying

Sprint race

Main race

Results

Qualification

Sprint Race Results
The Sprint took place on Sunday, April 15, 2007

Feature Race Results
The Feature Race took place on Sunday, April 15, 2007

Total Points

 Fastest Lap:

References

Shanghai, China
A1 Grand Prix